Tavalli (also Romanized as Tavallī; also known as Tavallā, Tavalleh, and Tawalla) is a village in Barkuh Rural District, Kuhsorkh County, Razavi Khorasan Province, Iran. At the 2006 census, its population was 1,181, in 328 families.

References 

Populated places in Kuhsorkh County